Gas initially in place (GIIP) or original gas in place (OGIP) denote the total estimated quantity (volume) of natural gas contained in a "subsurface" asset prior to extraction (production).

''Gas Initially In Place = Gross Rock Volume * Net/Gross * Porosity * average initial Gas Saturation / Formation Volume Factor

References

Petroleum production
Petroleum economics